Daniel Naroditsky (born ), also known as Danya,  is an American chess grandmaster, author, and commentator. He published his first chess book at age 14.

Chess career 
Born in San Mateo, California, Naroditsky learned chess at age six from his father, Vladimir. He was soon taking serious chess lessons. In May 2007, he won the Northern California K–12 Chess Championship, the youngest player ever to do so. Later that year, Naroditsky won the Under-12 division of the World Youth Chess Championship with 9½/11. In May 2008, he won the Northern California 9–12 Chess Championship.

At the 2010 U.S. Open Chess Championship, Naroditsky scored 7½/9 to share second through fifth places, behind grandmaster Alejandro Ramírez and tied with grandmasters Alexander Shabalov and Varuzhan Akobian. Naroditsky played in the 2011 U.S. Chess Championship, but finished with more losses than wins.  In July 2011, he earned his first grandmaster norm. Naroditsky earned his second grandmaster norm at the 2013 Philadelphia Open by tying for first place with GM Fidel Jimenez. In 2014, Naroditsky tied for 1st–5th with Timur Gareev, Dávid Bérczes, Sergei Azarov, and Sam Shankland in the Millionaire Chess Open in Las Vegas, Nevada.

In March 2014, Naroditsky was awarded the Samford Chess Fellowship.

Naroditsky wrote "The Practical Endgame", a column in Chess Life, from 2014–2020.

He is active on YouTube and Twitch, where he has over 258,000 subscribers and 227,000 followers, respectively. He plays on Chess.com under the handle DanielNaroditsky, and on Lichess.org under the handle RebeccaHarris. He frequently ranks close to, or at, the top on both websites' global leaderboards in Rapid and Blitz time controls.

In June 2022, he became the chess columnist for The New York Times.

Personal life
Naroditsky's parents are Jewish immigrants from the former Soviet Union. His father Vladimir immigrated from Ukraine, while his mother Lena came from Azerbaijan. Naroditsky graduated from Stanford University in 2019 with a degree in history. He lives in Charlotte, North Carolina, where he is the resident Grandmaster of the Charlotte Chess Center.

Books

References

External links
 
  
 
 
 

1995 births
Living people
American chess players
American chess writers
American male non-fiction writers
20th-century American Jews
Chess grandmasters
Jewish chess players
People from San Mateo, California
World Youth Chess Champions
Twitch (service) streamers
21st-century American Jews